Zaldy Goco (born 1966), also known mononymously as Zaldy, is a Filipino-American fashion designer. In 1995, he was featured as a model in a British television advertisement for Levi's. Zaldy was named one of Out magazine's Out 100 in 2006. He was the costume designer for Michael Jackson's This Is It tour, Lady Gaga's Monster Ball Tour, and Britney Spears's Femme Fatale Tour. Zaldy designed the costumes for the Cirque du Soleil shows Michael Jackson: The Immortal World Tour, Michael Jackson: One, and Volta. He was also the head designer for Gwen Stefani's fashion line L.A.M.B. He has received five Emmy nominations, winning in 2017, 2018, and 2019 for Outstanding Costumes for a Variety, Nonfiction, or Reality Programming due to his work on RuPaul's Drag Race.

Early life
Zaldy was born in Cheshire, Connecticut; his first name is Salvador but his parents called him Zaldy from birth. His grandmother sparked his interest in fashion.

Education
Zaldy was a student at Parsons School of Design in the 1980s, though he completed his studies in 1990 at the Fashion Institute of Technology.

Modeling
Zaldy walked runways for Thierry Mugler, Jean-Paul Gaultier, and Vivienne Westwood modeling women's clothing; he also modeled men's clothing in a Japanese advertising campaign for Paul Smith. In 1995, Zaldy, in drag, starred in a Levi's television commercial. This advertisement was banned in the United States and was only shown late at night in the United Kingdom. This Levi's advertisement was noted as marking a rise in the prominence of drag in pop culture.

Photoshoots and red carpets
Various celebrities have worn Zaldy's clothing in notable photoshoots or on red carpets. Beyoncé wore a Zaldy dress on the cover of the November 2005 issue of Vanity Fair. Film producer Lisa Maria Falcone, producer for 127 Hours, wore a Zaldy dress to the 83rd Academy Awards. Kesha wore a Zaldy dress to the 2012 MTV Video Music Awards. Chloe x Halle both wore Zaldy to the 2016 BET Hip Hop Awards; their stylist for the event, Zerina Akers, said: "I always like to use young, new talent, because I feel like we see so much of the same thing in fashion and on the red carpet. I thought it was fresh."

Stage and concert performances
The first stage costume Zaldy designed was for Lady Miss Kier, singer of Deee-Lite; she saw him at a club wearing a catsuit studded with mirrors and asked him to make her a similar outfit. His first time designing stage outfits for an entire musical group was for Scissor Sisters's 2006 performance for the Coachella Valley Music and Arts Festival. Zaldy later designed the costumes for the Japanese band Exile.

RuPaul
In the late 1980s, Zaldy met the American drag queen RuPaul at a night club in Union Square, Manhattan. He has designed his drag outfits since 1992. RuPaul wears Zaldy's outfits in the music video for his 1993 single "Supermodel (You Better Work)" and the Netflix series AJ and the Queen.

Zaldy designed RuPaul's suit for the 2019 Met Gala.

RuPaul's Drag Race

Zaldy designs the gowns for RuPaul on RuPaul's Drag Race. He has three other team members and an assortment of other craftspeople such as painters, beaders, and graphic designers.

For his work on Drag Race, Zaldy has received five Primetime Emmy Award nominations and three wins, in the category of Outstanding Costumes for a Variety, Nonfiction, or Reality Programming. He was first nominated for the 68th Primetime Creative Arts Emmy Awards for the season 8 premiere "Keeping it 100!" and received a second nomination, alongside Perry Meek, for the 69th Primetime Creative Arts Emmy Awards for the season 9 premiere "Oh. My. Gaga!" Zaldy and Meek won this Emmy. He received a third nomination in this category in 2018 for the season 10 premiere "10s Across the Board". In 2019 he also won an Emmy for the episode "Trump: The Rusical" alongside Art Conn, who designed Michelle Visage's outfit.

He also appeared as a guest judge alongside Kesha on the season 9 episode "Makeovers: Crew Better Work", and made a guest appearance in the season 12 episode "You Don't Know Me." Zaldy also appeared as a guest judge on the RuPaul's Drag Race All Stars season 6 episode "Show Up Queen".

Awards and nominations

References

Works cited

General references

 
 
 
 
 
 
 
 
 
 '

Further reading

External links
 
 
 
 

Living people
American people of Filipino descent
LGBT fashion designers
Primetime Emmy Award winners
1966 births
American fashion designers
American costume designers